Jingu Bashi (Shrine Bridge) can refer to two bridges in Japan:
 Jingu Bashi (Kashima)
 Jingu Bashi (Tokyo)